Daniel Carroll (1730–1796) was an American politician and plantation owner from Maryland.

Daniel Carroll may also refer to:
 Daniel Carroll (rugby union) (1892–1956), Australian-American rugby union footballer
 Daniel H. Carroll (1878–1966), American politician
 Daniel J. Carroll (1874–1927), New York politician
 Daniel Lynn Carroll (1797–1851), President of Hampden–Sydney College
 Daniel Patrick Carroll, better known as Danny La Rue (1927–2009), British entertainer
 Danny Carroll (Iowa politician) (born 1953), member of the Iowa House of Representatives
 Danny Carroll (Kentucky politician) (born 1963), member of the Kentucky Senate
 Dan Carroll (born 1949), American speed skater

See also
 Daniel O'Carroll (died 1750), British Army officer